The Musa Qala is a river in Afghanistan. It is a tributary of the Helmand River and highly participates in the irrigation of arable lands of the district. It is flowing 90 km through the Musa Qala district from North to South.

Rivers of Afghanistan